Thomas Mikusz (24 October 1970, Vienna) is an Austrian actor known for his work in television, film, animation, print and video games.

Career
After moving to Los Angeles in 2004 he received initial success with his appearance on the CBS show The Unit.  He is recognized in Germany and Austria due to his appearances on the shows EXTRA on RTL and on the talk show Planet Wissen on WDR.  His role models include Arnold Schwarzenegger,  Armin Müller-Stahl, Ingrid Bergman, Oskar Werner, and Thomas Kretschmann.

In 2011, Thomas won the German cooking competition show Das Perfekte Dinner.

Filmography

Television

Videogames

References

External links 
 Official homepage
 

1970 births
Austrian comedians
Austrian male television actors
Living people
Male actors from Vienna
Austrian male film actors
Male video game actors